The 1894 Geneva Covenanters football team was an American football team that represented Geneva College as an independent during the 1894 college football season. Led by fifth-year head coach William McCracken, Geneva compiled a record of 5–1.

Schedule

References

Geneva
Geneva Golden Tornadoes football seasons
Geneva Covenanters football